Gomm is a surname. Notable people with the surname include:

Archie Gomm (1897–1978), English footballer
Brian Gomm (1918–1995), British cricketer
Ian Gomm (born 1947), British singer-songwriter
Jon Gomm (born 1977), British singer-songwriter
Margaret Gomm (1921–1974), British swimmer
William Maynard Gomm (1784–1875), British Army officer
 Shirley Gomm (1943-present), Apple picker